Al-Ḥuseīniyah is one of the districts  of Ma'an governorate, Jordan.

References 

 
Districts of Jordan